The 10th British Academy Film Awardss, given by the British Academy of Film and Television Arts in 1957, honoured the best films of 1956.

Winners and nominees

Best Film
 Gervaise 
Amici per la pelle
Baby Doll
The Battle of the River Plate
Shadow
The Unfrocked One
Guys and Dolls
The Killing
The Man Who Never Was
The Man with the Golden Arm
Picnic
Poprygunya
Reach for the Sky
Rebel Without a Cause
Smiles of a Summer Night
A Town Like Alice
The Trouble with Harry
War and Peace
Yield to the Night

Best British Film
 Reach for the Sky 
The Man Who Never Was
The Battle of the River Plate
A Town Like Alice
Yield to the Night

Best Foreign Actor
 Francois Perier in Gervaise 
Karl Malden in Baby Doll
Pierre Fresnay in The Unfrocked One
Frank Sinatra in The Man with the Golden Arm
Spencer Tracy in The Mountain
William Holden in Picnic
James Dean in Rebel Without a Cause
Gunnar Bjornstrand in Smiles of a Summer Night

Best British Actor
 Peter Finch in A Town Like Alice 
Jack Hawkins in The Long Arm
Kenneth More in Reach for the Sky

Best British Actress
 Virginia McKenna in A Town Like Alice 
Dorothy Alison in Reach for the Sky
Audrey Hepburn in War and Peace

Best Foreign Actress
 Anna Magnani in The Rose Tattoo 
Carroll Baker in Baby Doll
Ava Gardner in Bhowani Junction
Maria Schell in Gervaise
Jean Simmons in Guys and Dolls
Susan Hayward in I'll Cry Tomorrow
Kim Novak in Picnic
Marisa Pavan in The Rose Tattoo
Eva Dahlbeck in Smiles of a Summer Night
Shirley MacLaine in The Trouble with Harry

Best British Screenplay
 The Man Who Never Was - Nigel Balchin 

Film010
1956 film awards
1957 in British cinema